Robert von Keudell (27 February 1824 - April 25/26 1903) was a German diplomat, politician and music lover.

Life
Von Keudell's parents were the Prussian major Leopold von Keudell (1769-1831) and his wife Wilhelmine von Hartmann (1789-1848). He was born in Königsberg. Keudell studied law at the Albertina University in Königsberg.

Keudell was an excellent pianist and admirer of Robert Schumann, with whom he corresponded from 1847 to 1853. His two wives were also talented pianists. His second wife played with Joseph Joachim and Anton Rubinstein, among others. In 1839-1840 he had become acquainted with Fanny Hensel in Italy and had encouraged her composition.

From 1872 to 1873 he was  German envoy at the Sublime Porte in Constantinople. In 1873 he became envoy to the Quirinal in Rome and - as a result of the embassy upgrading from 1876 -  German ambassador in Italy (until 1887). As a member of the Free Conservative Party he sat in the Reichstag in 1871/72 and from 1890 to 1893. From 1870 to 1872 and again from 1889 to 1893 he was a member of the Prussian House of Representatives.  He was a close friend of the German Chancellor Otto von Bismarck.

Robert von Keudell married on February 1, 1870 Hedwig Louise von Patow (1842–1882), a daughter of the politician Robert von Patow. After the death of his first wife, he married Alexandra von Grünhof (1861–1933), daughter of the Duke Ernst von Württemberg (1807–1868) They had three children together:
 Walter von Keudell (1884–1973)
 Otto Viktor von Keudell (1887–1972)
 Hedwig von Keudell (1891-1987)

Robert von Keudell died on April 25/26 1903 in Chojna.

References

Notes

Sources
 

1824 births
1903 deaths
Politicians from Königsberg
19th-century German diplomats
Members of the Reichstag of the German Empire
Free Conservative Party politicians